Churchill's Secret Agents: The New Recruits, originally released as Secret Agent Selection: WW2 in the UK, is a BBC television programme produced by Wall to Wall in association with Netflix. The five-part series was originally broadcast from Monday 29 June to Tuesday 8 May 2018.

Premise

This "living history" series reconstructs the training programme of one of the Second World War's most covert organizations. Fourteen modern day recruits undertake the same rigorous physical and psychological assessments as the 1940s candidates for the Special Operations Executive. The programme follows their progress to determine if they have what it takes to be an agent of SOE and fight the Nazis in occupied Europe.

The SOE was a civilian part of wartime British intelligence, responsible for sabotage and espionage. The organization recruited ordinary citizens from all backgrounds and walks of life, and put them through gruelling training to extract the traits necessary to be an SOE agent deep in enemy territory.

Filming occurred in Scotland on the Alvie and Dalraddy Estates in the Cairngorms area, and Forglen House and estate in Aberdeenshire.

Cast

The Trainers:
 Lieutenant Colonel Adrian Weale, commanding officer
 Brigadier Nicky Moffat, instructor
 Mike Rennie, military psychologist 
 Rod Bailey, SOE historian

The Recruits:
 Samy Ali, ex-armed forces, eliminated during training
 Rohini Bajaj, doctor, eliminated during training
 Roger Barris, retired investment banker, voluntarily resigned during training
 Charlotte Beauclerk, interpreter, eliminated during evaluation
 Will Beresford-Davies, paralegal, successfully completed the course
 Ceebe Cae (credited as Maria Sebe Camara), eliminated during evaluation
 Debbey Clitheroe, drama teacher, grandma, successfully completed the course
 Rob Copsey, ex-paratrooper, successfully completed the course
 Dan Dewhirst, corporate developer, eliminated during training
 Lizzie Jeffreys, research scientist, successfully completed the course
 Alastair Stanley, maths graduate, successfully completed the course
 Paul Stone, entertainer, eliminated during evaluation
 Magda Thomas, interpreter, successfully completed the course
 Vicki Wright, former police officer, eliminated during evaluation

Selection

In the first episode of the series, the 14 prospective recruits were put through an initial four-day selection process, to determine which candidates would proceed to training. As per the 1940s, the recruits were graded according to a colour code scheme, which was displayed on a blackboard using poker chips. The board made only fleeting appearances on screen and in the later stages looked like this:

Poker Chips

 The Recruit had an Outstanding performance in this portion of the test.
 The Recruit had a Good performance in this portion of the test.
 The Recruit had an Above Average performance in this portion of the test.
 The Recruit had a Below Average performance in this portion of the test.
 The Recruit had a Low performance in this portion of the test, but passed.
 The Recruit Failed this portion of the test.
 The trainers did not put a chip on the board.

Episodes

References

External links
 Secret Agent Selection: WW2 on BBC
 Churchill's Secret Agents on Netflix
 Secret Agent Selection: WW2 on IMDb
 Churchill's Secret Agents on Rotten Tomatoes

English-language Netflix original programming
2010s American reality television series
2018 American television series debuts
2018 American television series endings
Historical reality television series
2010s British reality television series
2018 British television series debuts
2018 British television series endings